

Slovak National Council (1848 – 1849; in rebellion during the Slovak Uprising) 
 Jozef Miloslav Hurban (1848 – 1849)

Revolutionary Executive Committee of the Slovak Soviet Republic (1919; in rebellion in eastern Slovakia) 
 no particular leader (6 June 1919 – 20 June 1919)

Assembly of the Slovak Land (1939; within Czechoslovakia) 
Martin Sokol (18 January 1939 – 14 March 1939)

Slovak Assembly / Assembly of the Slovak Republic (1939 – 1945; independent Slovakia) 
Martin Sokol (14 March 1939 – April 1945)

President of the Presidium of the Slovak National Council (1944 – 1945; in rebellion during the Slovak National Uprising) 
Presidium of the Slovak National Council (at that time Vavro Šrobár, Gustáv Husák, Ján Ursíny) (1 September 1944 – 5 September 1944)
Karol Šmidke and Vavro Šrobár (5 September 1944 – ?23 October 1944)
Presidium of the Slovak National Council (? – 11 April 1945)

Slovak National Council (called the National Council of the Slovak Republic since 1 October 1992) (1945 – 1992; within Czechoslovakia) 
Jozef Lettrich (11 April 1945 – 14 September 1945)
Karol Šmidke and Jozef Lettrich (14 September 1945 – 26 February 1948)
Karol Šmidke (acting) (26 February 1948 – 12 March 1948)
Karol Šmidke (12 March 1948 – 14 July 1950)
František Kubač (14 July 1950 – 15 June 1958)
Ľudovít Benada (23 June 1958 – 14 July 1960)
Rudolf Strechaj (14 July 1960 – 28 July 1962) – at the same time the highest executive officer in Slovakia
Jozef Lenárt (31 October 1962 – 20 March* 1963) – at the same time the highest executive officer in Slovakia [*other sources September]
Michal Chudík (23 March* 1963 – 29 December 1968) – at the same time the highest executive officer in Slovakia
Ondrej Klokoč (acting) (14 March 1968 – 27 June 1968)
Ondrej Klokoč (27 June 1968 – 16 March 1975)
Viliam Šalgovič (26 March 1975 – 30 November 1989)
Rudolf Schuster (30 November 1989 – 26 June 1990)
František Mikloško (26 June 1990 – 23 June 1992)
Ivan Gašparovič (23 June 1992 – 31 December 1992)

National Council of the Slovak Republic (1993–present) 

Source:

References

See also 
National Council (Slovakia)

Political history of Slovakia
Government of Slovakia
Slovakia
Lists of political office-holders in Slovakia
Main
Speakers